Portland Cà Phê (Vietnamese: "Portland Coffee") is a coffee shop with two locations in Portland, Oregon. The business specializes in Vietnamese coffee drinks, including robusta coffee and Vietnamese iced coffee, and also serves bánh mì and pastries.

After roasting robusta coffee beans as a hobby starting in 2020, Kimberly Dam opened the first brick and mortar location in southeast Portland in April 2021. A second location opened in northeast Portland in October 2022.

Description

Portland Cà Phê is a coffee shop with locations in southeast Portland's Creston-Kenilworth neighborhood and the northeast Portland part of the Eliot neighborhood. Drinks on the menu include Vietnamese iced coffee, rose matcha, and an ube latte with ube root extract.

According to Willamette Week Andrea Damewood, Portland Cà Phê is among the few Portland establishments serving cheese foam (blended whipped cream, cream cheese, and sea salt). She called the business "a low-key second outpost" of House of Banh Mi, a Vietnamese restaurant owned by the mother of Portland Cà Phê's owner. The coffee shop serves bánh mì with House of Banh Mi's "signature" egg butter, pickled carrots and daikon, cilantro, cucumber, and jalapeño. Coffee cinnamon rolls and "pastry pop tarts" from Jen's Bagels and Pastries are also available.

History

Owner Kimberly Dam established Portland Cà Phê during the COVID-19 pandemic. In 2020, she began roasting Vietnamese robusta coffee as a hobby, then supplying beans to House of Banh Mi as well as the food carts  Mama Đút and Matta. Dam fully opened the storefront on April 23, 2021, after operating with limited hours on April 17 and 18. Portland Cà Phê's two bean importers fell behind local demand because of supply chain issues related to the pandemic.

In 2022, Dam and co-founder Alex Tang announced plans to open a second location in at the intersection of Martin Luther King Jr. Boulevard and Northeast Russell Street. The shop opened on October 29.

Reception
In May 2021, Willamette Week Andrea Damewood said Portland Cà Phê "highlights the versatility of Vietnamese coffee beans, offering well-balanced drinks" and said the Vietnamese iced coffee is "just the right amount of sweet and strong". She called the fried onion tofu bánh mì "a standout" and wrote: Nick Woo and Krista Garcia included Portland Cà Phê in Eater Portland's 2021 list of the city's "mind-blowing Vietnamese restaurants and food carts". Katrina Yentch included the business in the website's 2022 list of "18 Knockout Spots for Affordable Dining in Portland".

References

External links

 

2020 establishments in Oregon
2021 establishments in Oregon
American companies established in 2010
Coffeehouses and cafés in Oregon
Coffee in Portland, Oregon
Creston-Kenilworth, Portland, Oregon
Eliot, Portland, Oregon
Northeast Portland, Oregon
Restaurants established in 2021
Vietnamese restaurants in Portland, Oregon